We Buy a Hammer for Daddy is the debut studio album by English experimental rock band Lemon Kittens. It was released in 1980, through record label United Diaries.

Background
The phrase "We buy a hammer for Daddy" originates from the caption to an illustration in the 1958 Ladybird book Shopping with Mother.

Track listing
All tracks composed by the Lemon Kittens

Critical reception

AllMusic's review was highly favourable, writing, "The tracks [...] are all highly original and have little precedent either in or beyond the annals of British pop/rock [...] We Buy a Hammer for Daddy belongs with Alternative TV's Vibing Up the Senile Man and the first This Heat LP as one of the milestones of experimental rock music."

Personnel
Lemon Kittens
Danielle Dax – vocals, bass, keyboards, tenor saxophone, soprano saxophone, flute, drone guitar, stick synthesizer], penny whistle, squeeze box, sleeve design, artwork
Karl Blake – vocals, guitar, drums, bass, keyboards, recorder, stick synthesizer, squeeze box
Technical
Bombay Ducks – engineering
David Mellor – engineering

References

External links

1980 debut albums
Lemon Kittens albums